The 1940 Creighton Bluejays football team was an American football team that represented Creighton University as a member of the Missouri Valley Conference (MVC) during the 1940 college football season. In its first season under head coach Maurice H. Palrang, the team compiled a 6–2–2 record (2–2 against MVC opponents) and outscored opponents by a total of 178 to 79. 

Creighton back Johnny Knolla led all college football players in 1940 with 1,420 yards of total offense in 10 games. His tally was higher than that of 1940 Heisman Trophy winner Tom Harmon.

The team played its home games at Creighton Stadium in Omaha, Nebraska.

Schedule

References

Creighton
Creighton Bluejays football seasons
Creighton Bluejays football